Son Beel is one of the largest lakes in southern Assam in India. It is situated in the Karimganj district, state of Assam.

References

''''
Lakes of Assam